eCATT (extended Computer Aided Test Tool) is a tool for software test automation developed by SAP. eCATT offers a graphical user interface with ABAP script editor and its own command syntax. The capability for recording and for parameterizing the test components is also present.

External links 
 Another blog for SAP eCATT tool
 eCATT Community on Orkut
 eCATT Tutorial

Software testing tools
SAP SE